Yeresiam or Iresim is an Austronesian language in the putative Cenderawasih (Geelvink Bay) language group of Indonesian Papua. It is not closely related to other languages.

References

South Halmahera–West New Guinea languages
Languages of western New Guinea
Cenderawasih Bay
Endangered Austronesian languages
Tonal languages in non-tonal families